Kjell Tommy Westlund (born December 29, 1974) is a Swedish former professional ice hockey right winger who played four seasons in the National Hockey League from 1999 to 2003 for the Carolina Hurricanes.

Professional Playing Career

Westlund began his career in Sweden's third tier league with Avesta BK.  Impressive performances earned him a contract with Brynäs IF of the Elitserien.  Westlund was drafted 93rd overall by the Carolina Hurricanes in the 1998 NHL Entry Draft.  After spending a season in the American Hockey League with the Beast of New Haven, he made his NHL debut in 1999.  He played 203 career NHL games scoring 9 goals and 13 assists for 22 points.  He missed the majority of the 2001-02 season after suffering a back injury during a game against the Columbus Blue Jackets on November 19, 2001.  He made a recovery and would go on to play 19 games during the 2002 Stanley Cup Playoffs during Carolina's surprise run to the 2002 Stanley Cup Finals. He would be cross-checked in the mouth by Detroit Red Wings defenseman Jiri Fischer in Game 4 of the championship series, resulting in Fischer being suspended for the deciding Game 5 in Detroit.

Westlund would spend most of the 2002-03 season as a healthy scratch.  He returned to Sweden in 2003 with Leksands IF before retiring from hockey. He is currently an Amateur Scout for the Pittsburgh Penguins.

Career statistics

Regular season and playoffs

International

References

External links

1975 births
Beast of New Haven players
Brynäs IF players
Carolina Hurricanes draft picks
Carolina Hurricanes players
Leksands IF players
Living people
Lowell Lock Monsters players
People from Avesta Municipality
Pittsburgh Penguins scouts
Swedish ice hockey right wingers
Sportspeople from Dalarna County